Marc Morgan (30 April 1962 – 10 January 2020) was a Belgian singer and songwriter.

After his talents were discovered by Yves Bigot and Philippe Poustis, Morgan excelled as a pop singer. His single ”Notre Mystère, nos retrouvailles ” reached the French Top 50 in 1993.

Morgan was educated at the École supérieure des arts Saint-Luc in Liège. He also worked as a professor at the École de recherche graphique in Brussels, the École supérieure des arts Le 75 in Woluwe-Saint-Lambert, and the  Haute école Albert Jacquard in Namur.

Albums
Ah ! Quel Massacre ! (1983)
Tendez vos lèvres (1989)
Pour la gloire (1993)
Un cygne sur l'Orénoque (1993)
Les grands espaces (1996)
Les parallèles se rejoignent (2001)
Phantom (2009, 2010, 2011)
La femme plastique (2010)
Beaucoup Vite Loin (2011)
The Tangible Effect Of Love (2012)
Good Luck Universe! (2016)

References

1962 births
2020 deaths
20th-century Belgian male singers
20th-century Belgian singers
21st-century Belgian male singers
21st-century Belgian singers
Belgian singer-songwriters
Male singer-songwriters
People from Huy